Curdin Perl (born 15 November 1984 in Samedan) is a Swiss cross-country skier who has competed since 2001. His best finish at the FIS Nordic World Ski Championships was seventh in the 4 × 10 km relay at Liberec in 2009 while his best individual finish was 27th in the 50 km event at those same championships. In the 50 km at the 2013 World Ski Championships in Val di Fiemme, Italy Curden went off and gained a 20-second four minutes into the race only to be caught later on.

Perl's best individual World Cup finish was tenth in a 15 km event in Davos in 2007. He has a total of eleven victories from 10 km to 30 km between 2003 and 2007.

He finished tenth in the 4 × 10 km relay at the 2010 Winter Olympics in Vancouver.

Cross-country skiing results
All results are sourced from the International Ski Federation (FIS).

Olympic Games

World Championships

World Cup

Season standings

Individual podiums
1 podium

Team podiums
 1 victory – (1 ) 
 1 podium – (1 )

References

External links
 

1984 births
Cross-country skiers at the 2010 Winter Olympics
Cross-country skiers at the 2014 Winter Olympics
Living people
Olympic cross-country skiers of Switzerland
Swiss male cross-country skiers
Tour de Ski skiers
People from Maloja District
Sportspeople from Graubünden
21st-century Swiss people